Amorka is a town in the Ihiala government area of Anambra State of Nigeria. It is located along the Onitsha-Owerri Expressway, on the border of Mgbidi Imo Statė. Amorka is a home to the former Biafran Airport stripes. Amorka is a home to a famous Bunker of Dim Chukwuemeka Odumegwu Ojukwu during the Biafran war and still exists . The traditional ruler of the town is Chief Nze Keneth Obiriolemgbe. Amorka can boast of many Elites. Late Engineer Mark Ezemba a very well known politician in Anambra state and Nigeria. Hon Chidi Udemadu representing Ihiala constituency, Barrister Chinweuba Ndukaihe, Barrister Lawrence Nwaketi, Barister SUS Mbanaso, Chief Nze Dr Philip Chuddy Ogwo, Chief Cally's Obiagazie, Mr Chinedu Ezidiegwu, Chief Nze Victor Ezemba, Mr Ebere Igbokwuputa, Prof Simeon Alozieuwa, Chief Nze Benson Ogwo (Akuamia1), Prince Louis obiriolemgbe, Chief Michael Ezemba Egbedike, Hon Chidiebere Chidon (Dontels), Hon Enyebros Ogwo, Nze Chidozie Ezidiegwu, and numerous others. Amorka has 10 villages.

During the Civil War 
One community in the entire Igbo region stood out throughout the 33-month civil war as a result of the struggle for a new republic for several reasons. Amorka, a border town in Anambra State that shares a border with the Mgbidi people of Imo State, is the place in question.

Significance 
Amorka was important for several reasons, not just one. The Biafra Airport, which is actually in Amorka but was mistakenly named Uli Airstrip, and the 

Ojukwu Bunker, which protected Dim Chukwuemeka Odumegwu Ojukwu, the head of the Biafra nation.

Once more, the airfield was used to import military hardware to support the Biafran people in their fight, as General Gowon's command to starve the Biafran people of food prevented anyone from considering utilizing an airport in Nigeria to transport aid to the Biafran population. The airport effectively served as Biafra's gateway to the outside world in this fashion.

Amorka was a unique area during the war because of the Ojukwu Bunker, which provided a safe haven for the leader of Biafra. Those who knew that Ojukwu was constantly in Amorka, in the underground bunker, despite popular belief that he had fled the nation. It has a bunker.

References

Populated places in Anambra State